Cacographis is a genus of moths of the family Crambidae.

Species
Cacographis macrops Munroe, 1970
Cacographis osteolalis Lederer, 1863
Cacographis undulalis Schaus, 1913

References

Midilinae
Crambidae genera
Taxa named by Julius Lederer